The Home office of the Basque Government or the Department of Security, is the department responsible for the security of the Basque Country. This department was created in 1936 and restored in 1980. It is led by the nationalist Estefania Beltran de Heredia (from 2012).

Organization 
This department is divided into two sub departments. It comprises 12 directorates, 1 cabinet and 3 child agencies.

Department of Security
Cabinet of the Minister
Directorate of Social Relations with Media
Directorate of Care to Victims of Terrorism
Directorate of Gender Violence Victims
Sub Department of Administration and Services
Directorate of Economic Management and Infrastructures
Directorate of Legal System and Services
Directorate of Human Resources
Sub Department of the Interior
Directorate of Emergencies and Meteorology
Directorate of Electoral Administration, Gambling and Shows
Directorate of Traffic
Sub Department of Security
Cabinet of the Vice Minister for Security
Ertzaintza - Basque Police
Directorate of Cabinet and Technical Resources
Directorate of Municipal Police Coordination and Private Security

Basque Government